The 2008 Tour de Vineyards was a cycling tour centered on the New Zealand city of Nelson, and was held between 2 and 5 January 2008. The men's race was eventually won by New Zealander Jeremy Yates, while fellow New Zealander Serena Sheridan took out the woman's title.

Full results of the race can be found on the cyclingnews.com website, here.

Men's stage summary

Men's top 10 overall

Women's stage summary

Women's top 8 overall

References
 Cyclingnews.com home page for the 2008 Tour de Vineyards

2008 in road cycling
2008 in New Zealand sport
Cycle races in New Zealand
Sport in the Marlborough Region
Sport in the Tasman District
Sport in the Nelson Region
Women's road bicycle races
2008 in women's road cycling